Bombhunters is a 2006 documentary film produced and directed by Skye Fitzgerald, that documents the effects of unexploded ordnance on Cambodian people, both within their homeland and in the US.

Production
Including a Fulbright Scholarship, the project was funded by the Sundance Institute and the United States Institute of Peace, including grants from The Office of Weapons Removal and Abatement in the U.S. Department of States Bureau of Political-Military Affairs.

Based upon his 2001 trip to Cambodia, Skye Fitzgerald, a graduate of Eastern Oregon University, spent 6 months in Cambodia and Vietnam creating the documentary Bombhunters.

Music was used from the popular Canadian post-rock band Godspeed You! Black Emperor.  The band allowed songs from Yanqui U.X.O. to be used, stating that while they didn't normally allow their music to be used in films, they could align with the social nature of the film.

Purpose
The film project documents the effects of UXO* on Cambodian people, both within their homeland and in the US. In particular, Bombhunters documents villagers efforts throughout rural Cambodia as they seek out UXO and attempt to render it safe for sale to the scrap metal industry in order to survive.

Release
When the film had its premiere in November 2005 in Portland Oregon.  This film has been showcased in many film festivals across the globe including; Hot Springs Documentary Film Festival, Rhode Island International Film Festival, Palm Beach International Film Festival, Planet in Focus Environmental Film Festival,  Seattle Human Rights Film Festival, and Northwest Film & Video Festival.

In addition to broadcast on US public television the film has aired on the History Channel Asia, Free Speech television in the US and on select national channels in Europe, including national broadcast on TV2 in Sweden.

Response
Since completion, the film has been credited by the US Department of State with influencing national legislation in Cambodia that has led to a 50% drop in UXO tampering casualties.

References

External links
Bombhunters at the Internet Movie Database
Official website
Film trailer

2006 films
American documentary films
2006 documentary films
Military history of Cambodia
Aftermath of the Vietnam War
Documentary films about Cambodia
2000s English-language films
2000s American films
English-language documentary films